The Iliad is an epic poem attributed to Homer.

Iliad may also refer to:
 iLiad, an e-book reading device
 Iliad (company), a French telecommunications provider
 Iliad Glacier, Antarctica
 Iliad Italia, an Italian telecommunications operator
 Iliad, a derivative of the IBM 801 processor

See also
 J. D. Frazer, a comic artist and writer who writes under the pen name Illiad